Fourth Army or 4th Army may refer to:

Germany 
 4th Army (German Empire), a World War I field Army
 4th Army (Wehrmacht), a World War II field army
 4th Panzer Army

Russia - Soviet Union 
 4th Army (Russian Empire)
 4th Army (RSFSR)
 4th Army (Soviet Union)
 4th Air Army, Soviet Union and Russia
 4th Guards Army, Soviet Union
 4th Tank Army, Soviet Union

Others 
 4th Army (Austria-Hungary)
 Fourth Army (Bulgaria)
 Fourth Army (National Revolutionary Army), Republic of China
 New Fourth Army, Republic of China
 Fourth Army (France)
 Fourth Army (Italy)
 Fourth Army (Japan)
 Fourth Army (Ottoman Empire)
 Fourth Army (Romania)
 Fourth Army (United Kingdom)
 Fourth United States Army
 4th Army (Kingdom of Yugoslavia)

See also
 IV Corps (disambiguation)
 4th Division (disambiguation)
 4th Brigade (disambiguation)
 4th Regiment (disambiguation)
 4th Squadron (disambiguation)